The International Conference on Nitride Semiconductors (ICNS) is a major academic conference and exhibition in the field of group III nitride research. It has been held biennially since 1995. Since the second conference in 1997, hosting of the event has rotated between the Asian, European and North American continents. The ICNS and the International Workshop on Nitride Semiconductors (IWN) are held in alternating years, both covering similar subject areas.

ICNS-9 was held at the Scottish Exhibition and Conference Centre in Glasgow, Scotland, on 10–15 July 2011. Keynote speakers included Professor Umesh Mishra (University of California Santa Barbara and Transphorm) and Professor Hiroshi Amano (Meijo University,
Nagoya). ICNS-10 was held in Washington, D.C., United States on 25–30 August 2013, ICNS-11 was held in Beijing, China 30 August–4 September 2015 and ICNS-12 will take place in Strasbourg, France on 24–28 July 2017.

ICNS-13 was held 7-12 July 2019 in Seattle, Washington, United States, was chaired by Alan Doolittle (Georgia Institute of Technology, USA)

Conference list

See also 
 Gallium nitride
 Indium nitride
 Aluminium nitride

References 

Physics conferences
Technology conferences